An Introduction to Syd Barrett is a 'best of' compilation featuring the work of Syd Barrett spanning the period 1967–1970, including both material written during his time with Pink Floyd and his post-band solo career.

Release
The album was released in the UK and Europe on 4 October 2010, with different release dates for the rest of the world. The album features a series of new remasters and remixes, all overseen by Pink Floyd's David Gilmour. The cover art, featuring various images relating to songs contained within the album, was designed and created by long-term Pink Floyd conceptual artist Storm Thorgerson. The album reached 104 in the UK charts.

An extra track for CD and iTunes buyers is the previously unreleased 20-minute-long instrumental "Rhamadan", available with a link to download it.

Track listing
All songs written and composed by Syd Barrett. All tracks are 2010-digitally-remastered, except where noted.

 Tracks 1–6 are performed with Pink Floyd.
 Tracks 1–4 were later released as part of the Pink Floyd box set, The Early Years 1965–1972.
 Track 19 was later released as an additional bonus track on The Madcap Laughs 2015 Japanese reissue.

References

External links
 An announcement of compilation, from David Gilmour's official blog

2010 compilation albums
Syd Barrett albums
Harvest Records compilation albums
EMI Records compilation albums
Capitol Records compilation albums
Albums produced by Joe Boyd
Albums produced by Peter Jenner
Albums produced by Roger Waters
Albums produced by David Gilmour
Albums produced by Richard Wright (musician)
Pink Floyd compilation albums
Albums with cover art by Storm Thorgerson
Compilation albums published posthumously